Harrovian may refer to:

 a member of Harrow School, Harrow, London, England, UK; an independent school
 an inhabitant of the town of Harrow, London, England, UK
 an adjective for the London Borough of Harrow, England, UK
 pertaining to the Harrow London Borough Council, England, UK
 pertaining to Harrow High School, Borough of Harrow, London, England, UK
 an adjective for Harrow College, Borough of Harrow, London, England, UK
 The Harrovian, school newspaper for Harrow School, Harrow, London, England, UK

See also

 List of Old Harrovians, Harrow School, Harrow, London, England, UK
 List of people from Harrow, Borough of Harrow, London, England, UK
 Harrow (disambiguation)

Harrovian